Humberto Padrón (born 1967) is a Cuban film director.

Padrón graduated from ISA (Superior Institute of Arts) in Havana. He has since directed several awards winning documentary shorts including "Y Todavia el Sueño" (1999) and "Los Zapaticos me Aprietan" (2000). In 2001 he directed his first fictional piece, a 47-minute independent featurette called "Video de Familia" (2001) which tells the story of a broken family that decides to send a video letter to a homosexual son who left for the US. The film's sincere approach to a taboo subject in Cuba, earned rave reviews from Cuban critics audiences alike. His first feature, also shot independently, was "Frutas en el Café".

External links

 Full Filmography and awards list at ICAIC's (Cuban Film Industry) Official Website

Cuban film directors
1967 births
Living people